Sochiapam is a Chinantec language of Mexico. It is most similar to Tlacoatzintepec Chinantec, with which it has 66% intelligibility (intelligibility in the reverse direction is 75%, presumably due to greater familiarity in that direction).

Sochiapam has seven tones: high, mid, low, high falling, mid falling, mid rising, low rising.

Like other Chinantec and Mazatec languages, Sochiapam Chinantec is noted for having whistled speech (produced only by men, but understood by all). More unusually, it has also been reported to have a rare marked absolutive case system.

Phonology 

The following are sounds of Sochiapan Chinantec:

1. Parenthesised sounds are loans, allophones, or free variants
2. /p, t, k/ tends to be slightly aspirated
3. Alveolar and velar consonants are palatalised before the semivowel /j/

Tones

References

 Foris, David Paul. 2000. A grammar of Sochiapam Chinantec. Studies in Chinantec languages 6. Dallas: SIL International and UT Arlington.

External links
 A whistled conversation in Sochiapan Chinantec (SIL-Mexico)
 A documentary on Sochiapam Chinantec Whistled Speech (Whistles in the Mist)
Sochiápam Chinantec Whistled Speech Collection of Mark Sicoli at the Archive of the Indigenous Languages of Latin America

Chinantec languages
Whistled languages